Ochrota asuraeformis is a moth of the subfamily Arctiinae. It was described by Strand in 1912. It is found in Tanzania.

References

Endemic fauna of Tanzania
Lithosiini
Moths described in 1912